Teófilo Laborne Ferreira (born 2 June 1973 in Belo Horizonte) is a former international freestyle swimmer from Brazil. He participated at the 1992 Summer Olympics for his native country. His best result was the 7th place in the men's 4×200-metre freestyle. Ferreira also won three medals at the Pan American Games and four medals at the World Championships.

Teófilo was at the 1991 Pan American Games in Havana, where he won a gold medal in the 4×100-metre freestyle, and a silver in the 4×200-metre freestyle.

At the 1992 Summer Olympics in Barcelona, he went to the 4×200-metre freestyle final, finishing 7th. Also participated in the 50-metre freestyle, where Ferreira not reached the final.

The Brazilian broke in 1993 two World Records on short course. On 7 July, the Brazil team, composed of Fernando Scherer, Teofilo Ferreira, José Carlos Souza and Gustavo Borges broke the world record in 4×100-metre freestyle with a time of 3:13.97, which belonged to Sweden since 19 March 1989: 3:14.00. On 5 December, Brazil again beat the record, with the same team, doing 3:12.11.
 This mark was achieved in 1993 FINA World Swimming Championships, where he won gold in the 4×100-metre freestyle, and bronze in the 4×200-metre freestyle (breaking the South American record with a time of 7:09.38). He also finished 14th in the 200-metre freestyle.

At the 1994 World Aquatics Championships, held in September in Rome, Italy, the Brazilian got the bronze in the 4×100-metre freestyle relay. Ferreira also finished 27th in the 200-metre freestyle.

Teófilo was in 1995 Pan American Games in Mar del Plata, where he won a silver medal in the 4×200-metre freestyle.

At the 1995 FINA World Swimming Championships (25 m) done in Rio de Janeiro, he won bronze in the 4×200-metre freestyle.

References

External links
 

1973 births
Living people
Swimmers at the 1991 Pan American Games
Swimmers at the 1992 Summer Olympics
Swimmers at the 1995 Pan American Games
Olympic swimmers of Brazil
World record setters in swimming
Brazilian male freestyle swimmers
World Aquatics Championships medalists in swimming
Medalists at the FINA World Swimming Championships (25 m)
Pan American Games gold medalists for Brazil
Pan American Games silver medalists for Brazil
Pan American Games medalists in swimming
Medalists at the 1991 Pan American Games
Medalists at the 1995 Pan American Games
Sportspeople from Belo Horizonte
21st-century Brazilian people
20th-century Brazilian people